Food Federation Germany (German: Lebensmittelverband Deutschland) is the leading association of the German food sector, representing the food value chain in Germany from farm to fork, i.e., from agriculture, food manufacturing, food craft and food retail to gastronomy. The association operates offices in Berlin, Germany, as well as Brussels, Belgium.

Membership 
The association's membership includes some 70 associations, 250 companies – ranging from mid-sized firms to international corporations –, as well as 150 organizational and individual members.

The association itself is a member of the European food industry body FoodDrinkEurope as well as of European Movement Germany.

History 

Food Federation Germany was founded on March 10, 1955 in Nuremberg, Germany, under the name Federation for Food Law and Food Science (German: Bund für Lebensmittelrecht und Lebensmittelkunde, abbreviated BLL) as a re-establishment of the Federation of German Food Manufacturers and Traders (German: Bund Deutscher Nahrungsmittel-Fabrikanten und -Händler) that had been active from 1901 to 1945. In May 2019, the association's general meeting voted for changing the association's name to Food Federation Germany (German: Lebensmittelverband Deutschland). The name change came into force in July 2019, followed by a rebranding process that was awarded a Rebrand 100: merit at the 2020 Rebrand 100 Global Awards.

References

External links
 Food Federation Germany's English website

Food industry trade groups
Food- and drink-related organizations
1955 establishments in Germany